The Bitter Springs are an English rock group from the London suburb of Teddington. The band evolved from Last Party, who had formed in 1985, with the name changing in 1996. The band have released two albums as Last Party, and six as The Bitter Springs and also played with Vic Godard as Subway Sect, on and off for nine years.

History
Last Party formed in 1985, although their history stretches back to the band No Trains At The Bay, which the members formed at school in 1978, and who had a song called "The Last Party". One of their earliest gigs was in support of The Sound, their original drummer Steve Infield being a housemate of The Sound's bass player Graham Bailey. They released their debut album on their own Harvey label the following year. They were the support act at The Stone Roses' first London gig, at the Greyhound in Fulham, and were favourites with John Peel, recording two sessions for his BBC Radio 1 show, one in 1987 and a second in 1989.
In 1995, the band members at the time (singer Simon Rivers, bass player Daniel Ashkenazy, Kim Ashford, and Neil Palmer) decided on a new name, The Bitter Springs, changing their name "in the hope that journalists who had ignored the Last Party would give us another listen". The debut release under this new name, the Addison Brothers EP, featured Vic Godard, and the Bitter Springs enjoyed a long association with Godard, acting as his backing band, the Subway Sect, for nine years, also contributing to studio recordings including Godard's Blackpool album, where Godard and the Bitter Springs provide musical backing to lyrics by Irvine Welsh. Allmusic's Stewart Mason described the album as "entirely typical of the band's output, showing both their strengths and weaknesses", and noted Rivers' "wry sense of humor and an eye for romantic futility". Lyricist and singer Simon Rivers has also performed solo, the first time in 2007 supporting The Band of Holy Joy.

Discography

Singles

As Last Party
"Mr. Hurst" (1987) Harvey
"Tree Shada" (1987) Idol
"Damp" (1998) Idol
"Die In a Spy Ring" (1989) Idol
"Black Leather Sheets" (1992) Bilberry
"Creature Lake" (1993) Harvey
"UCIT" (1994) Dishy
Contrast Split Single Club Vol.2 (1994) Contrast (track: "Fix Me")
"Selective Memory" (1995) Dishy

As The Bitter Springs
Addison Brothers EP (1996) Vespertine
"Absence Makes the Hair Grow Blonder" (1997) Trade 2
"It's Business" (1997) Wurlitzer Jukebox
Barbara EP (1998) Dishy
"A Good Provider" (1998) Debut - joint single with Esposito
"Manners, Pianos, Mouthorgans" (1998) Amberley
Stop The World EP (2001) Acuarela
Poor Trace EP (2006) Harvey
Firm Family Favourites EP (2006) Harvey
"And Even Now" (2009) - digital download
"My Life as a Dog in a Pigsty" (2010) - digital download
"TV Tears" (2010) - digital download
"Gary Glitter Fan Convention" (2011) - digital download
"Snowflakes in June" (2011) - digital download
"Something Good Together/Portrait Of A Marriage" (2015) - 7"  Acuarela Records
"The Hounslow Solicitors" (2015) -  digital download

Albums

As Last Party
Porky's Range (1986) Harvey
Love Handles (1990) Harvey
Cacophony on Port Hampton - Singles and Rarities 1985 - 1995 (2008) (digital download only)

As The Bitter Springs
From The Parish of Arthritis (1997) Dishy
Five Die Filming This Lazy Lark (1998) Vespertine
Benny Hill's Wardrobe (1999) Vespertine
The Best Bakers on the Island - El Grande Espanol (2000) Acuarela (compilation of Last Party and Bitter Springs tracks)
The Suburban Crimes of Every Happiness (2001) Dishy
That Sentimental Slush (2006) Harvey
Everyone's Cup of Tea (2013) Harvey
Cuttlefish And Love's Remains (2015) Harvey

Compilation appearances
Les Inrockuptibles - French Magazine CD - "Hell's Angel"
Les Inrockuptibles - French Magazine CD - "Christmas #1"

References

English rock music groups
Musical groups established in 1985
1985 establishments in England